Top Junk is a dance-punk indie rock band from the Philippines. Band members are Izel Sarangelo (vocals, synth), Coy Placido (guitar, bass, keys, synth), and Dennis Leung (drums). Coy (from the band sessiOnroad) and Izel (a.k.a. Tuesday Vargas) are the group's chief composers.

Formed in 2005, the band's upbeat musical style combines elements of punk rock, disco, pop music, new wave music and funk music. Their songs mostly emphasize on straightforward everyday musings.
The band chose a name that reflects the constant contradictions of life in general, from simple concerns to philosophical musings. The group uploaded their demos through various websites and made their initial music available at no cost.

In December 2009, Top Junk released their self-titled album under Indie label D Chord Records, and released a zombie-themed video.

In September 2014 Top Junk released an EP titled RETOX, with the carrier "Significant Other."
Top Junk is included in the P Fest UK Line Up
headlined by Sandwich (band), Pedicab (band), Yano, Squid 9 & more which showcases Pilipino distinguished musical artists.

Discography 

Top Junk (2009)
Retox (2014)

References

External links
Official website
Soundcloud website

Filipino rock music groups
Musical groups from Manila
Musical groups established in 2005